The Burton is a historic apartment building located at Indianapolis, Indiana.  It was built in 1920, and is a two-story, Spanish Colonial Revival style stuccoed building on a raised basement.  It features a semicircular metal arched entrance hood, stepped gables, and a red tile roof.

It was listed on the National Register of Historic Places in 1983.

References

Apartment buildings in Indiana
Residential buildings on the National Register of Historic Places in Indiana
Mission Revival architecture in Indiana
Residential buildings completed in 1920
Residential buildings in Indianapolis
National Register of Historic Places in Indianapolis